The 1980–81 Southern Football League season was the 78th in the history of the league, an English football competition.

Alvechurch won the Midland Division, whilst Dartford won the Southern Division. Alvechurch were declared Southern League champions after defeating Dartford 4–3 on penalties, after the two championship play-offs had finished 3–3 on aggregate (Alvechurch won 1–0 at home and Dartford won 3–2). Despite Alvechuch being champions, they declined promotion to the Alliance Premier League alongside Dartford as their board thought they were not ready, with third-placed Trowbridge Town going up in their place. There was no relegation for the second successive season, although Bognor Regis Town transferred to the Isthmian League at the end of the season.

Bedford Town, who finished second to Alvechurch in the Midland Division on goal difference, won the Southern League Cup.

Midland Division
The Midland Division consisted of 22 clubs, including 21 clubs from the previous season and one new club:
Redditch United, relegated from the Alliance Premier League

Bedford Town needed to beat Enderby Town by eight goals in their last game of the season to win the league but only won 2-0 making Alvechurch the champions.

Dave Lewis of Gloucester City was top scorer for the season with 27 goals.

League table

Southern Division
There were no new clubs in the Southern Division this season. Though, at the end of the previous season Addlestone was renamed Addlestone & Weybridge Town and Folkestone & Shepway was renamed Folkestone.

At the end of the season Margate was renamed Thanet United.

League table

See also
 Southern Football League
 1980–81 Isthmian League
 1980–81 Northern Premier League

References

Southern Football League seasons
6